Benjamín Hill is the municipal seat of Benjamín Hill Municipality in the  Mexican state of Sonora.

Location
There are municipal boundaries with  Santa Ana in the northeast, Opodepe in the south, and Trincheras in the west.  The elevation of the municipal seat is 853 meters above sea level.

Geography and climate
Most of the land is flat, desert land with no permanent water courses.  The climate is hot and dry with  average summer maximums of 31.6 °C and average winter minimums of 13.8 °C.  The average annual temperature is 22.5 °C.

Economy
Agricultural activity is modest with only 747 hectares registered in 2005.  The main crops are wheat, corn and grasses for cattle fodder.

There is cattle raising with over 13,000 head counted in 2005.  Calves are often exported to the United States of America.

The industrial sector shows potential with several small industries located in an industrial park.  Proximity to the important Federal Highway 15 could stimulate this sector in the future.

History
Benjamín Hill owes its existence to the railroad.  In 1939 it was just a ranch called San Fernando when the federal government chose it for the junction of the Ferrocarril Sonora-Baja California and the Ferrocarril Sud-Pacífico railways, which was finished in 1948.  It was given municipal status in 1952. The name is derived from Benjamín Hill, the Sinaloan military leader whom President Venustiano Carranza appointed Governor of Sonora in 1914.

References

 Enciclopedia de los Municipios de Mexico

External links
Benjamín Hill, Ayuntamiento Digital (Official Website of Benjamín Hill, Sonora)

Populated places in Sonora
1942 establishments in Mexico